The Netherlands Football League Championship 1914–1915 was contested by eighteen teams participating in two divisions. The national champion would be determined by a play-off featuring the winners of the eastern and western football division of the Netherlands. Sparta Rotterdam won this year's championship by beating Vitesse Arnhem 3–0 in a Championship Play-off Replay match.

Due to World War I there was no Eerste Klasse South competition, it was suspended for one season.

New entrants
Eerste Klasse East:
Be Quick Zutphen

Eerste Klasse West:
USV Hercules (returning after three seasons of absence)

Divisions

Eerste Klasse East

Eerste Klasse West

Championship play-off

Replay

Sparta Rotterdam won the championship.

References

RSSSF Netherlands Football League Championships 1898-1954
RSSSF Eerste Klasse Oost
RSSSF Eerste Klasse West

Netherlands Football League Championship seasons
1914–15 in Dutch football
Netherlands